Instinct (stylized as INSTIИCT) is an American police procedural drama television series which premiered on March 18, 2018, on CBS. The series is based on James Patterson's 2017 novel Murder Games. In May 2018, CBS renewed the series for a second season. The second season premiered on June 30, 2019. The series was cancelled near the end of its second season, on August 17, 2019. The series is notable for featuring a gay male character in the lead, who is married to another man.

Premise
Author, university professor, and former CIA paramilitary officer Dr. Dylan Reinhart (Alan Cumming) is lured back to his old life by New York police detective Elizabeth Needham (Bojana Novakovic) when she needs his help to stop a serial killer who is using Reinhart's book as inspiration for murders.

Cast and characters

Main
 Alan Cumming as Dylan Reinhart, an author, psychology professor, and former CIA paramilitary officer, now a consultant to the NYPD in solving bizarre cases
 Bojana Novakovic as Elizabeth "Lizzie" Needham, an NYPD detective third grade who is stationed at the fictional 11th Precinct and Dylan's partner. Her partner, and fiancé, was killed in the line of duty a year prior, and she had since then refused to have a partner before meeting Dylan.
 Daniel Ings as Andrew "Andy" Wilson, Dylan's husband, a lawyer-turned-bar-owner who still uses his law skills to help their friends when needed
 Naveen Andrews as Julian Cousins, a contact of Dylan's from his days at the CIA who now works freelance and who specializes in computers and information retrieval
 Sharon Leal as Jasmine Gooden, an NYPD lieutenant who leads the 11th Precinct and who is Lizzie's supervisor and friend

Recurring
 Whoopi Goldberg as Joan Ross (season 1), Dylan's literary agent
 Andrew Polk as Doug, the medical examiner
 John Mainieri as Jimmy Marino, a police detective
 Michael B. Silver as Kanter Harris, a police sergeant
 Danny Mastrogiorgio as Anthony Fucci, a police detective
 Alejandro Hernandez as Rafael Sosa (season 1), a police detective
 Stephen Rider as Zack Clark, a police officer, later detective
 Travis Van Winkle as Ryan Stock (season 2), a police detective from Garfield County, Nebraska, who comes to New York to help the NYPD on the case of a potential serial killer
 Reshma Shetty as Maya Bhaduri (season 2), Julian's former lover and co-worker from his days at MI6, who comes to warn him about a group trying to shut down the city's first responders' unit, only to be murdered by them

Production

Development
Instinct is based on James Patterson's Murder Games. The series was picked up to pilot by CBS on January 23, 2017. On May 12, 2017, CBS picked it up to series. On May 12, 2018, CBS renewed Instinct for a second season. Instinct was cancelled after its second season on August 17, 2019.

Casting
On February 8, 2017, Alan Cumming was cast as Dylan Reinhart. Bojana Novakovic was cast as Lizzie on February 18, 2017. On February 23, 2017, Daniel Ings was cast as Andy, and Naveen Andrews was cast as Julian. Khandi Alexander was originally cast as Monica Hernández in the pilot, but was replaced with Sharon Leal on June 22, 2017.

Episodes

Season 1 (2018)

Season 2 (2019)

Reception

Critical response
The review aggregation website Rotten Tomatoes reported an approval rating of 54% based on 26 reviews, with an average rating of 5.44/10. The website's consensus reads, "Instinct is ultimately an underwhelming police procedural, despite having Alan Cumming in its arsenal." Metacritic, which uses a weighted average, assigned the series a score of 53 out of 100 based on 12 reviews, indicating "mixed or average reviews".

The character of Dylan Reinhart has been called groundbreaking for being the first openly gay lead character in an hour-long American network television drama series.

Ratings

Season 1

Season 2

Home media 
The first season was released in Region 1 on December 11, 2018 and on Region 2 on December 17, 2018.

Notes

References

External links

 
 
 

2010s American LGBT-related drama television series
2010s American crime drama television series
2010s American police procedural television series
2018 American television series debuts
2019 American television series endings
CBS original programming
English-language television shows
Fictional portrayals of the New York City Police Department
Gay-related television shows
Television shows based on American novels
Television series by CBS Studios
Television shows set in New York City